Tunji Balogun is a Nigerian American record label executive.

Career
Balogun began his career as a marketing intern at Warner Brothers Records and was hired as an assistant at the label after he graduated from Pomona College in 2004. He later held a position in A&R at Interscope, where he worked with artists signed through Bad Boy Entertainment and Shady Records, in addition to Kendrick Lamar, ScHoolboy Q, Keyshia Cole, OneRepublic, and others.  He joined RCA in 2015 as senior vice president of A&R, and was promoted to executive vice president in 2018. At the time of his promotion, RCA announced that it had entered into a joint venture with Balogun, Courtney Stewart, Jon Tanners, and Jared Sherman to establish Keep Cool. The first artist signed to Keep Cool was Normani.

A co-founder of Keep Cool, he was the executive vice president of A&R for RCA Records. Balogun signed or participated in the signing of artists including Brockhampton, Childish Gambino, Goldlink, H.E.R., Khalid, SZA, Bryson Tiller, and Cozz.

He was named CEO of Def Jam in August 2021, and assumed the position in January 2022.

References

External links
 Keep Cool
 Def Jam

Living people
American music industry executives
American people of Nigerian descent
Pomona College alumni
Year of birth missing (living people)